Kaduqli or Kadugli (   Sudanese pronunciation) is the capital city of South Kordofan State, Sudan. It contains Hilal Stadium.

Economy 
It is  a trading centre for gum arabic and livestock. Industries include textiles, soap factories, and the production of leather. Kaduqli is also the Headquarters of Sector IV of the UNMIS (United Nations Mission in Sudan). The sector IV HQ houses the Egyptian Contingent and also includes the Indian Aviation Contingent, flying MI-17 helicopters.

Climate 
Kaduqli has a hot semi-arid climate (Köppen climate classification BSh).

External links
The Nuba Mountains Homepage

References

Populated places in South Kordofan
State capitals in Sudan